Black Square may refer to:

 Black Square (album), of 2009 by DD/MM/YYYY
 Black Square (band), a musical group from Hawaii, United States
 Black Square (film), of 1989 by Iosif Pasternak; see 1989 Cannes Film Festival
 Black Square (painting), by Kazimir Malevich
 DJMax Portable Black Square, a 2008 video game